Symington is a conservation village in South Ayrshire, Scotland. It is located in Symington parish, covering , and lies close to the A77 road from Ayr to Glasgow. Its church, built in 1160, remains one of the finest examples of a Norman church in Scotland.

Meaning of place-name 
The name of the village and parish of Symington is derived from the person of a Norman Knight, Symon Loccard or Lockhart, who held the barony of Symington lands under Walter fitz Alan, the first Steward in 1165. The Lockharts of Barr in Galston were a branch of this family. Stevenston in Ayrshire is named for Steven Loccard or Lockart.

Facilities 
Symington has a primary school, church, a restaurant, War Memorial, an abandoned water tower and a library.

Buildings
The Wheatsheaf Inn
The Wheatsheaf Inn (NS 38417 31331) is an 18th-century vernacular building that has been a hostelry since its earliest days; in the days of stage coaches the inn was a posting stage on the route to Ayr.

Halfway House
Dating from 1937 this substantial mock-Tudor building was previously a hotel and replaced an inn that was burnt down in 1935.

Broadmeadows House
This Arts & Crafts style house was built in 1931-4 by Noad & Wallace. It is embellished with gargoyles, inscriptions, and other ornamental additions. Broadmeadows is the focus of the residential centre known as Hansel Village.

Symington's churches

The parish church was founded in the 12th century by Simon Loccard and is the oldest functioning church in Ayrshire. It belonged to the Trinitarian Monastery at Fail (just outside Tarbolton). The Church was restored in the 18th century and again in 1919. This restoration by P. MacGregor Chalmers revealed that the earlier alterations of 1797 had covered up some fine architectural features, including the 13th century windows and the open-work timber roof. Three windows with semi-circular heads are located in the gable, with heavy hood moulds and dog-tooth ornamentation, the finest of their style in Scotland. The base slab of an aumbrey incorporating a piscina sits as the sill of a south-facing window. The church received an addition and alterations in 1797 which increased the accommodation of the building, but detracted considerably from the unspoilt appearance. A belfry, possibly incorporating some medieval work, was erected on the east gable end in the 17th century. Notable stained glass windows are on display, by Gordon Webster, Douglas Strachan, and others. The patronage of the church passed through several hands and was at length acquired by the Earl of Eglinton. The old manse in Kerrix Road is now known as Symington House (NS 38350 31325).

The Free Church
The Disruption of 1843 resulted in the establishment of a second church, now demolished, at the junction of Main Street and Symington Road. The minister of the parish, George Orr, and his congregation "came out" and, for a time, worshipped in this vacant public house adapted for the purpose, whilst the minister lived in a rented room in a nearby farm house. The new Free Church and schoolhouse were built in February 1844.

Country houses 

Coodham
In 1826 Mrs William Fairlie, widow of a banker from Calcutta built the mansion house and in total expended £20,000 on various improvements. She renamed the estate Williamfield in honour of her late husband. In the 1870s W H Houldsworth Esq owned the property and added a new wing, conservatory and a private chapel designed by Alfred Waterhouse. It was bought by a religious order after WWII was known as  'Fatima House, Coodham' and used as a retreat house with a new wing added. In the 80s the house was put on the market. Various plans for its redevelopment failed and in the meantime the house deteriorated and was  vandalised and burnt out. The house was eventually rebuilt as individual flats.

In 1850 James Ogilvie Fairlie of Coodham organised a meeting at the Red Lion in Prestwick of fifty-seven gentlemen from the West of Scotland, leading to the formation of the Prestwick Golf Club and as a direct result in 1860 the first Open Championship was held.

Dankeith
First recorded as Dalketh or Freris Dalkeithe this property was given to the Black Friars of Ayr and held by them until the Reformation. Alane of Lawdor had given the lands in memory of his wife. The Cunninghames obtained the lands in 1614 and they held the property until the 1690s, when William Kelso acquired it. In 1839 Lieutenant-Colonel William Kelso was the owner of Dankeith. The Factor's house of the Dankeith Estate was Craigowan House in Brewlands Road. Dankeith House itself was built in 1893, incorporating an earlier building. The estate had a fine range of hothouses. In May 1857 Dankeith was rented by Janet Story, wife of Dr Story. She published her Early Reminiscences in which she comments on her servants, in particular she refers to the daughter of a local gamekeeper in glowing terms she is perfectly lovely; just seventeen, tall with the figure of a nymph, quantities of golden hair, a skin like milk and eyes like the pearls of a forget-me-not. I never saw anyone more exquisite ..

John Kelso Hunter (1802–1873) was born at Gillhead Cottage, close to Symington cemetery, on the Dankeith Estate and was at first employed here during his indenture as a herd boy, his father being a gardener. John moved to the village of Dundonald and became a respected artist, noted for portraiture. In 1847 he exhibited at the Royal Academy in London before becoming a regular exhibitor at the Royal Scottish Academy for the next 25 years. Hunter published two books: ‘Retrospective of an Artist’s Life’ (1868), and ‘Life Studies of Character’. He is buried in the Southern Necropolis in Glasgow.

In 1932 Dankeith was fire damaged, but restored. In WW2 it was used by the RAF and secret planning meetings for D-day and other allied operations took place here. In 1948 the Roman Catholic Passionist Fathers acquired the property as a retreat, however they sold the property circa 1968 and the site is now a leisure centre, with caravans surrounding the house.

Townend House and Cottage
Hugh Glover held the lands of Townend circa 1701-4 and in 1733 William Kelso of Dankeith sold the lands to George Boyd of East Overloan Farm. William Hay Boyd, Esq. of Her Majesty's 20th Regiment of Infantry in the Crimea and was the owner of Townend House (NS 37652 31552) and estate in 1839. Townend is an 18th-century building with a Victorian Italianate wing. A dated lintel in the walled garden may have come from an earlier building on the site; the old stables, were converted into a small dwelling in the 1960s. In recent times Townend Cottage has functioned as a nursing home, Townend Cottage, circa 1810, situated in the village was its former dower house. The Hay-Boyds gave land for the village hall, a school, and a garden next to the church.

Rosemount
Dr. Fullerton of Rosemount returned from India, circa 1770 and rebuilt the mansion-house at Rosemount, previously known as Goldring, improved the cultivation of the land, and ornamented the grounds with the belts of plantings that are apparent today (2011).

Other Notable Residents
 John Rae Covenanting preacher - died in prison on the Bass Rock.
Prof John Stirling Young FRSE (1894-1971) pathologist

Ordnance Gazetteer entry
In 1882–4, Francis Groome's Ordnance Gazetteer of Scotland described Symington thus:

Symington, a village and a parish in the NW of Kyle district, Ayrshire. The village stands 3½ miles NNE of Monkton station, and 6 SSW of Kilmarnock, under which it has a post office.

The parish is bounded NE by Riccarton, E by Craigie, S and SW by Monkton, and W and NW by Dundonald. Its utmost length, from NNE to SSW, is 43/8 miles; its breadth varies between 1 and 2¼ miles; and its area is 3736½ acres, of which 11½ are water. In the extreme S the surface declines to close on 100 feet above sea-level; and thence it rises gently to a maximum altitude of 333 feet at a point 21/3 furlongs NNE of the church, from which it sinks again to 201 feet near the Riccarton border. It thus exhibits a pleasing diversity of swells and slopes, and contains many vantage-grounds commanding extensive views of great part of Ayrshire, the Firth of Clyde, and the Isle of Arran. Trap rock has been quarried for road metal, and sandstone for building; whilst limestone and coal exist, but not under profitable conditions. The soil, in general, is of a clayey character., on a hard subsoil. Nearly all the land, except about 300 acres under wood, is regularly or occasionally in tillage. The principal residences are Coodham, Dankeith, Rosemount, and Townend; and 5 proprietors hold each an annual value of £500 and upwards, 5 of between £100 and £500. Symington is in the presbytery of Ayr and the synod of Glasgow and Ayr; the living is worth £350. The parish church is an old building with Norman features, and, as entirely remodelled in 1880, contains 359 sittings. There is also a Free church; and the public school, with accommodation for 132 children, had (1884) an average attendance of 85, and a grant of £69, 16s. Valuation (1860) £6560, (1885) £7104, 5s. 3d. Pop. (1801) 668, (1841) 918, (1861) 855, (1871) 792, (1881) 697.—Ord. Sur., shs. 22, 14, 1865-63.

Archaeology
A Law or Moot Hill once stood at the foot of the village and upon its removal some iron arrow-heads and horn combs were found. Helenton Moot Hill may have been a fortified site at one time and the Helenton Loch with its associated mill were nearby.

The Slough of Despond

On the boundary of Dundonald and Symington parishes lies an area known as the 'Slough of Despond'.

The burn in this area, rising near the old Broadhirst Farm, has long been known as the Slough, the Scots equivalent spelling is Sleugh, meaning a marsh or quagmire. It is not known how the name 'Slough of  Despond' was added to the area, however it is recorded since the mid 19th century and may be linked to the nearby limekilns that were generally notorious for the acrid 'hell-like' smoke that issued from them.

The Slough Burn still rises from the marshy area below the Broadhirst Woods, however the limestone quarry that served the limekilns is now abandoned, surviving as an area rich in wildlife, containing old woodland indicator plants such as Wood Anemone (Anemone nemorosa), Bluebell (Hyacinthoides non-scripta), Wood Sorrel (Oxalis acetosella), Dog's Mercury (Mercurialis perennis), Herb Robert (Geranium robertianum) and other species. The Slough Burn runs down past Dankeith House, Templeton and Fortacres, Todrigs and Caprington, to join the River Irvine near Gatehead.

Micro-history
Freestone and whinstone are the underlying rocks and the church itself stands on an elevated outcrop.

The parish covered 3725 acres and had a population of 697 in 1881.

See also
 Helenton Loch
 Clevens Loch, Ayrshire
 Murder of James Young

References 
Notes

Sources
 Adamson, Archibald R. (1875). Rambles Round Kilmarnock. Kilmarnock : T. Stevenson.
 Aitchison, Jean (2001). Servants in Ayrshire 1750-1914. Ayr : AANHS. .
 Allan, Shiela et al. (2003). Historic Prestwick and its surroundings. Ayr : AANHS. .
 Beattie, Frank (2011). An Ayrshire Postcard Collection. Chalford : Amberley Publishing. .
 Campbell, Thorbjørn (2003). Ayrshire. A Historical Guide. Edinburgh : Birlinn. .
 Close, Robert (1992). Ayrshire and Arran: An Illustrated Architectural Guide. Pub. Roy Inc Arch Scot. .
 Dobie, James D. (ed Dobie, J.S.) (1876). Cunninghame, Topographized by Timothy Pont 1604–1608, with continuations and illustrative notices. Glasgow: John Tweed.
 Groome, Francis H. Ordnance Gazetteer of Scotland. London : Caxton.
 Love, Dane (2003). Ayrshire : Discovering a County. Ayr : Fort Publishing. .
 MacIntosh, John (1894).  'Ayrshire Nights' Entertainments. Kilmarnock : Dunlop and Drennan.
 McMichael, George (c. 1881 - 1890). Notes on the Way Through Ayrshire and the Land of Burn, Wallace, Henry the Minstrel, and Covenant Martyrs. Hugh Henry : Ayr.
 Nimmo, John W. (2003). Symington Village, Church and People. Darvel : Alloway Publishing. .
 
 Smith, John (1895). Prehistoric Man in Ayrshire. London : Elliot Stock.

External links
Video and commentary on Symington Church
Video and narration on Helenton Motte, Mill and Loch
Video and narration on the Slough of Despond
Video and narration on Jock o'the Whalps

Villages in South Ayrshire